The 2007 Finnish Figure Skating Championships took place between December 8 and 10, 2006 in Mikkeli. Skaters competed in the disciplines of men's singles and women's singles on the senior and junior levels. The event was used to help determine the Finnish team to the 2007 European Championships.

Senior results

Men

Ladies

External links
 results

Finnish Championships,2007
Finnish Championships,2007
2007
2006 in Finnish sport
2007 in Finnish sport